The Left Hand of the Law (or La polizia interviene: ordine di uccidere)  is a 1975 Italian "poliziottesco" written and directed by Giuseppe Rosati.

Cast
Leonard Mann: Captain Mario Murri
James Mason: Senator Leandri
Stephen Boyd: Lanza
Enrico Maria Salerno: Minister 
Antonella Murgia: Laura
Fausto Tozzi: Giulio Costello
Janet Ågren: Gloria
Franco Interlenghi:   Colombo
Ennio Balbo: Lombardi
Peppino Di Capri: Singer

References

External links

1975 films
Italian crime action films
1970s Italian-language films
English-language Italian films
1970s English-language films
Poliziotteschi films
1970s crime action films
Films directed by Giuseppe Rosati
1970s Italian films